Henry Cooper House, also known as The Daughters of American Pioneers Museum and Cooper Cabin, is a historic home located at Parkersburg, Wood County, West Virginia. The log cabin was erected in Slate District, Wood County, in 1804, by Henry Cooper, and is believed to be the first two-story log cabin in Wood County. In August 1910, the City of Parkersburg purchased the structure for $400. After being dismantled, the house was rebuilt in the Park in September 1910.  In 1911, title was granted by the City Council to the Centennial Chapter - Daughters of American Pioneers. The cabin is open as a museum.

It was listed on the National Register of Historic Places in 1986.

References

External links
 Parkersburg museums, including Henry Cooper Log Cabin Museum

History museums in West Virginia
Houses in Parkersburg, West Virginia
Houses on the National Register of Historic Places in West Virginia
Museums in Wood County, West Virginia
National Register of Historic Places in Wood County, West Virginia
Houses completed in 1804
Houses completed in 1910
Log buildings and structures on the National Register of Historic Places in West Virginia
Rebuilt buildings and structures in West Virginia